Péter Eötvös (born 2 January 1944) is a Hungarian composer, conductor and teacher.

Eötvös was born in Székelyudvarhely, Transylvania, then part of Hungary, now Romania. He studied composition in Budapest and Cologne. From 1962, he composed for film in Hungary. Eötvös played regularly with the Stockhausen Ensemble between 1968 and 1976. He was a founding member of the Oeldorf Group in 1973, continuing his association until the late 1970s. From 1979 to 1991, he was musical director and conductor of the Ensemble InterContemporain (EIC). From 1985 to 1988, he was principal guest conductor of the BBC Symphony Orchestra.

Early life
As a child, Eötvös received a thorough musical education, including works by Béla Bartók. He felt a strong link between Hungarian grammar and Bartók's music, claiming that the specific "Hungarian" interpretations of music by Bartók and Kodály (as well as other Hungarian conductors such as Szell, Fricsay, Ormandy, Solti, Reiner) show subtle accents and rhythms of the Hungarian language.

His mother, a pianist, participated in the musical and intellectual life of Budapest and took her son to many performances and rehearsals of opera, operetta and theatre. He learned the piano, and also wrote plays and small pieces. He won a composition contest at age eleven and was then noticed in the Hungarian artistic world. He then met Ligeti, 21 years his senior, who recommended him to Kodály at the Franz Liszt Academy of Music. He was accepted with honours at the Academy, where he studied composition with János Viski, on Kodály's advice.

In 1958, he was asked to accompany film projections with improvisations on piano and hammond organ. He was then asked to write scores for theatre and cinema. By 1970, he had composed several pieces of utility music. He learned the importance of timing and synchronisation. He also discovered noise as a sound, which was the starting point of some later compositions. The work Zero Points begins with a countdown, as if destined to synchronise sound and image, the double bass then takes on a high-pitched sound reminding the cracks of an old magnetic tape.

During a period of ten years he developed personal musical preferences, for Gesualdo (the idea of the madrigal returns in pieces such as Drei Madrigalkomödien and Tri sestry (Three Sisters)), American jazz of the 1960s, electronic music (of which Karlheinz Stockhausen's figure was inseparable), and Pierre Boulez, among others. He quickly distanced himself from other composers of the Academy.

Later career 
In 1970, Eötvös requested a scholarship to go study abroad, leaving for Cologne (DE), following the examples of Kurtág and Ligeti. The Hochschule für Musik Köln and the studio of the broadcaster Westdeutscher Rundfunk worked together at that time, which allowed students to use advanced technology in one of the best studios in Europe. Eötvös worked there from 1971 to 1979 He studied composition with Bernd Alois Zimmermann, as well as conducting. He met Stockhausen, already knowing his work really well. Eötvös became Stockhausen's engineer and copyist (the score of Telemusik is copied by him), and his musician and conductor, amongst other things conducting the La Scala premiere of Donnerstag aus Licht in 1981, as well as its Covent Garden performances in 1985.

In 1978, Boulez asked him to conduct the opening concert of IRCAM in Paris (FR). He was then appointed musical director of the Ensemble InterContemporain, holding the position until 1991. He performed at the Proms in 1980, and was regularly invited by the BBC Orchestra between 1985 and 1988. This period also marks his first success as a composer with his Chinese Opera (1986), written for the 10-year anniversary of the Ensemble InterContemporain. The piece constitutes a reflexion on the theatricality of sound, as the composer spreads the musicians through the stage, a process also found in Three Sisters. Each movement is a tribute to directors he admired: Bob Wilson, Klaus Michael Grüber, Luc Bondy, Patrice Chéreau, Jacques Tati and Peter Brook.

Jean-Pierre Brossman, director of the Opéra National de Lyon (FR) at that time, admired his ability to take into consideration the work of artists and directors, and commissioned an opera in 1986: Three Sisters, based on Chekhov's play. In 2008, he premiered two other operas, Lady Sarashina and Love and Other Demons.

Eötvös was principal guest conductor of the Gothenburg Symphony Orchestra (SE) from 2003 to 2007. His recording of Luciano Berio's Sinfonia with the London Voices (DG) received the award for "Technical excellence in recording" by the BBC Music Magazine in 2006. He served as a member of the jury of the Tōru Takemitsu composition competition in 2014.

Composition style
Eötvös's music shows the influence of a variety of composers. As director of the Ensemble InterContemporain, he was exposed to styles, as is evidenced in the variety of timbres and soundworlds within his music. Extended techniques such as over-pressure bowings coexist with lyrical folk songs and synthesized sounds. Eötvös provides detailed instructions on how to mix instruments for electronic manipulation or amplification. His first large-scale compositions were for film. This often reflects on his later pieces in moments of atmospheric airiness. Two of his compositions for orchestra and voice, Atlantis and Ima, were inspired by Sándor Weöres' poem Néma zene.

Most of his works are published by Schott Music in Mainz (DE) and distributed by Presto Music and Outhere Music.

Awards
 Prize Bartok-Pasztory (1997)
 Kossuth Prize (2002)
 Budapest Honorary Citizen (2003)
 Commandeur des Arts et des Lettres (2003)
 Grand Prix Antoine Livio from the Presse musicale internationale (2006)
 Frankfurter Musikpreis (2007)
 Hungarian Order of Saint Stephen (2015)
 Grand Prix artistique (composition musicale) de la Fondation Simone et Cino Del Duca (2016)
 Goethe Medal (2018)

Memberships
 Member of the Academy of Arts, Berlin (1997)
 Member of the Széchenyi Academy of Literature and Arts (Széchenyi Iroldami és Művészeti Akadémia)
 Member of the Sächsische Akademie der Künste in Dresden
 Member of the Royal Swedish Academy of Music (2000)

Works

Stage works
 Sleepless, opera (2021 Berlin State Opera, 2022 Grand Théâtre de Genève)
 Senza sangue, opera (2015 Cologne, 2016 Festival d'Avignon)
 Der goldene Drache, opera (2013/2014, for Ensemble Modern)
 Paradise Reloaded (Lilith) (2012/13)
 The Tragedy of the Devil (Die Tragödie des Teufels), opera (22 February 2010, Bavarian State Opera)
 Lady Sarashina, opera (4 March 2008, Opéra de Lyon)
 Love and Other Demons, opera (10 August 2008, Glyndebourne Festival)
 Angels in America, opera (2002–2004)
 Le Balcon, opera (2001/02)
 As I Crossed a Bridge of Dreams, opera (1998–99)
 Three Sisters, opera (1996–97)
 Radames, chamber opera (1975/97)
 Harakiri, opera (1973)

Orchestra works
 Alhambra (Violin Concerto No. 3), violin and orchestra (2018)
 Per Luciano Berio (2018)
 Reading Malevich (2017–18)
 Multiversum, for organ, Hammond organ and orchestra (2017)
 Alla vittime senza nome (2017)
 Dialog mit Mozart (2016)
 Halleluja – Oratorium balbulum, four fragments for mezzo-soprano and tenor solo, narrator, choir and orchestra (2015)
 Hommage à Domenico Scarlatti, for horn soloist and string chamber orchestra (2013)
 Speaking drums, percussion concerto (2012/13)
 DoReMi (Violin Concerto No. 2), violin and orchestra (2012)
 The gliding of the eagle in the skies (2011)
 Cello Concerto Grosso, for cello and orchestra (2010–11)
 Levitation, for two clarinets and string orchestra (2007)
 Konzert für zwei Klaviere (2007)
 Seven (Violin Concerto No. 1), violin and orchestra (2006)
 CAP-KO, concerto for piano, keyboard and orchestra (2005)
 Jet Stream, trumpet concerto (2002)
 IMA, for soloists, choir and orchestra (2002)
 zeroPoints (1999)
 Two monologues, for baritone and orchestra (1998)
 Replica, viola concerto (1998) – recorded by Kim Kashkashian on ECM Records
 Atlantis, for solo baritone, boy soprano, zymbalom, virtual choir and orchestra (1995)
 Psychokosmos, zymbalon concerto (1993)
 Chinese Opera (1986)

Ensemble works
 Secret kiss, melodrama for narrator and 5 instruments (2018)
 da capo (Mit Fragmenten aus W. A. Mozarts Fragmenten), for cimbalon or marimba and ensemble (2014)
 Dodici, for 12 cellos (2013)
 Octet (2008), for flute, clarinet, 2 bassoons, 2 trumpets, 2 trombones
 Sonata per sei, for two pianos, three percussion and one sampler keyboard (2006)
 Snatches of a conversation, for double-bell trumpet solo and ensemble (2001)
 Paris–Dakar, for trombone solo, brass and percussion (2000)
 Shadows, for flute, clarinet and ensemble (1996)
 Psy, first version for harp, alto flute/piccolo and viola; second for harp, alto flute/piccolo and violoncello (1996)
 Triangel, percussionist and ensemble (1993)
 Brass – The Metal Space, actions for 7 brass players and 2 percussionists without conductor (1990)
 Steine, for ensemble (1985–90)
 Windsequenzen, for ensemble (1975/1987)
 Intervalles-Interieurs, ensemble and electronics (1981)
 Windsequenzen (1975/1987)

Vocal music
 Goretsch! Goretsch!, for mezzo-soprano solo (2017)
 Die lange Reise, for soprano and piano (2014)
 Herbsttag, for female choir (2011)
 Schiller, energische Schönheit, for 8 singers, 8 wind instruments, 2 percussion and accordion (2010)
 Octet Plus, for soprano, flute, clarinet, 2 bassoons, 2 trumpets, 2 trombones (2008)
 Solitude / Egyedül, for children or women's choir, in memoriam Kodály (1956/2006)
 Drei Madrigalkomödien, for 12 voices:
"Insetti galanti" (1970–90)
"Hochzeitsmadrigal" (1963–76)
"Moro Lasso" (1963–72)

Chamber music and solo works 
 Lisztomania, for piano four hands (2018)
 désaccord 2, for 2 violas, in memoriam B.A. Zimmermann (2018)
 Joyce, for clarinet solo (2018)
 Joyce, for clarinet and string quartet (2017)
 Sentimental, for trumpet in E-flat doubling flugelhorn (2017)
 "Now, Miss!",  for violin and cello, based on Samuel Beckett's "Embers" (2016)
 The sirens cycle, soprano and string quartet (2015/16)
 Molto Tranquillo, trio for piccolo doubling alto-flute, cello and piano (2015)
 para Paloma,  violin solo (2015)
 O rose!, piano solo (2015)
 a Call, violin solo (2015)
 Lectures différentes, saxophone quartet (2014)
 New Psalm, percussion solo (2012/13)
 Dances of the Brush-footed Butterfly, piano solo (2012)
 Cadenza, flute solo (2008)
 Natasha, soprano, violin, clarinet and piano  (2006)
 Erdenklavier-Himmelklavier nr. 2., piano solo (2003/2006)
 Encore, string quartet (2005)
 Un taxi l´attend, mais Tchékhov préfère aller à pied., piano solo (2004)
 Erdenklavier-Himmelklavier nr. 1., piano solo (2003)
 Zwei Promenaden, percussion, keyboard and tuba (1993/2001)
 Derwischtanz, for 1 or 3 clarinets (1993/2001) 
 Kosmos, solo or two pianos (1961/99)
 Two poems to Polly, solo cello (1998)
 Psalm 151, for percussion (1993)
 Thunder, solo timpani (1993)
 Korrespondenz, for string quartet (1992)
 5 Klavierstücke, piano solo (1959/60/61)

Electronic music 
 Psy, tape (1996)
 Elektrochronik, tape (1974)
 "Now, Miss!"  violin, synthesizer with tape (1972)
 Music for New York (1971)
 Cricketmusic, tape (1970)
 Mese (Märchen /Tale/Conte), tape (1968)

Theater and film music 
 Sándor Sára: Könyörtelen idök – Relentless Times (1991)
 Judit Elek: Tutajosok Raftsmen (1990)
 Sándor Sára: Tüske a köröm alatt – Thorn under the Nail (1987)
 Károly Makk: Macskajáték – Cat´s play (1974)
 Mihály Szemes: Az alvilág professzora – The professor of inferno (1969)
 Ferenc Kardos: Egy örült éjszaka – A Crazy Night (1969)
 János Tóth: Aréna – Arena (1969)
 Zoltán Huszárik: Amerigo Tot (1969)
 Shakespeare: Téli rege – The Winter´s Tale (1969)
 Shakespeare: Athéni Timon – Timon of Athens (1969)
 Katona: Bánk bán (1968)
 Foltos és Fülenagy – Spotty and Bigears (1966)
 János Szücs: Szomjuság – Thirst (1965)
 Gábor Oláh: Három kivánság (1965)
 Hét szem mazsola – Seven Raisins (1965)
 Ellopott bejárat – Stolen Entrance (1965)
 Anouilh: Becket (1965)
 Madách: Az ember tragédiája – Tragedy of Man (1964)
 Lermontov: Hóvihar – The Storm (1964)
 Pirandello: Hat szerep keres egy szerzöt – Six characters in search of an author (1964)
 István Szabó:  (1964)
 Iván Lakatos: Mozaik – Mosaic (1964)
 Twist Oliver – Oliver Twist (1963)
 Tennessee Williams: Üvegfigurák- The Glass Menagerie (1963)
 O'Neill: Amerikai Elektra – Mourning becomes Electra (1963)
 Pál Gábor: Aranykor – Golden Age (1963)
 Zoltán Fábri: Nappali sötétség – Darkness at noon (1963)
 István Bácskay-Lauro: Igézet – Spell (1963)
 János Rózsa: Tér – Space (1962)
 Pál Gábor: Prometeusz – Prometheus (1962)
 Pál Gábor: A megérkezés – The Arrival (1962)
 Károly Esztergályos: Ötödik pozicióban – In fifth position (1962)
 Büchner: Leonce és Léna – Leonce and Lena (1961)
 Sean O'Casey: Az ezüst kupa – The Silver Tassie (1961)

Portrait-film and documentary film 
 The seventh door
 En souvenir de Trois Soeurs
 Talentum
 Trois Soeurs – opera film
 Le Balcon – opera film
 Angels in America – opera film

Withdrawn compositions 
 désaccord – pour deux altos (2001)
 600 Impulse (2000)
 Der Blick, tape (1997)
 Endless Eight II. for ensemble – Apeiron musikon (1988–89)
 Pierre Idyll (1984)
 Endless Eight I. for ensemble (1981)

As conductor
 Elliott Carter: What Next? (ECM 1817)
 Friedrich Cerha: Konzert für Violoncello und Orchester / Franz Schreker: Kammersymphonie (ECM 1887)
 Helmut Lachenmann: Schwankungen am Rand (ECM 1789)
 Béla Bartók: Concerto for Viola and Orchestra / Eötvös: Replica for Viola and Orchestra / György Kurtág: Movement for Viola and Orchestra (with Kim Kashkashian and the Netherlands Radio Chamber Orchestra (RKO), 1999, ECM New Series 1711)
 Igor Stravinsky: The Rite of Spring, Junge Deutsche Philharmonie, 2004, BMC Records
 Luciano Berio:  Sinfonia for 8 Voices and Orchestra / Ekphrasis (Continuo II) for Orchestra, Göteborgs Symfoniker, London Voices, 2005, Deutsche Grammophon – 0289 477 5380 3 GH

References

External links

 
 
 Peter Eötvös Contemporary Music Foundation website
 Harrison Parrott (agents) biography, reviews, etc.
 Ricordi Berlin (publisher) biography, work list
 Editio Musica Budapest (publisher) biography, work list
 Schott Music (publisher)
 Durand Salabert Eschig (publisher)
 Peter Eötvös discogs.com

1944 births
Living people
20th-century classical composers
20th-century conductors (music)
20th-century Hungarian male musicians
21st-century classical composers
21st-century conductors (music)
21st-century Hungarian male musicians
Hungarian classical composers
Hungarian male classical composers
Hungarian opera composers
Hungarian film score composers
Hungarian conductors (music)
Male opera composers
Male conductors (music)
Male film score composers
Commandeurs of the Ordre des Arts et des Lettres
Members of the Academy of Arts, Berlin
Academic staff of the Hochschule für Musik Karlsruhe
Academic staff of the Hochschule für Musik und Tanz Köln
Deutsche Grammophon artists
ECM Records artists
People from Odorheiu Secuiesc
Pupils of Karlheinz Stockhausen
Members of the Széchenyi Academy of Literature and Arts